Jean Christine Carroll (born 19 June 1980) is an Irish former cricketer who played as a wicket-keeper. She appeared in eight One Day Internationals and five Twenty20 Internationals for Ireland between 2007 and 2009.

References

External links

1980 births
Irish women cricketers
Living people
Ireland women One Day International cricketers
Ireland women Twenty20 International cricketers
Cricketers from Dublin (city)
Wicket-keepers